Brigsley is a village and civil parish in North East Lincolnshire, England, and on the B1203 road,  south from Waltham.

According to the 2001 Census its population was 370, reducing to 355 at the 2011 Census.

Brigsley Grade II listed Anglican parish church is dedicated to St Helen. It is 11th century with later additions, 1796 alterations, and 19th and 20th century restorations. It has a Norman tower with an Early English nave and chancel.

References

External links

Villages in Lincolnshire
Borough of North East Lincolnshire
Civil parishes in Lincolnshire